Mabel Cheung  (born 17 November 1950) is a film director from Hong Kong. She is one of the leading directors in Hong Kong cinema and is considered one of the three women (along with Ann Hui and Clara Law) to achieve acclaim in the New Wave/Second Wave in Hong Kong. Elected "Freshman's Queen" when she was studying undergrad at the University of Hong Kong, she was also an avid sportswoman representing Lady Ho Tung Hall and the University of Hong Kong. Cheung made her first film in 1985 as a student at New York University. Cheung is known for working with the migration issues of Hongkongers and overseas Chinese, especially before the 1997 handover of Hong Kong.

Her films include the "migration trilogy": The Illegal Immigrant (1985), An Autumn's Tale (1987) and Eight Taels of Gold (1989). The Soong Sisters (1997) marks another peak of her filming career. All four films were made in collaboration with writer Alex Law.

Cheung is a Guest Lecturer at the Hong Kong Baptist University Academy of Film and an Honorary University Fellow at the University of Hong Kong.  

Cheung is the Vice-Chairperson of the Hong Kong Film Development Council.

Filmography

The To My Nineteen-Year-Old-Self Controversies 
In January 2023, three graduates of Ying Wa Girl's School accused Cheung and the school authority of wrongdoing through the public distribution of To My Nineteen-Year-Old Self, the film commissioned by Cheung's alma mater Ying Wa Girl's School for an alumni fundraising project. Three of the six subjects of the film accused Ying Wa and Cheung of placing what was originally promised as an internal project on public screens without their consents. Katie Kong, one of the documentary’s subjects, said in an Instagram story that she had signed the consent after the film crew told her “everyone else” had done so.   

In the documentary, Cheung's camera follows six schoolgirls for over a decade to witness the agony and ecstasy of growing up during a turbulent time in Hong Kong.

Wai-sze Sarah Lee,  Hong Kong professional track cyclist and bronze medalist in the women's keirin at the 2012 London Olympics, also accused Cheung and the crew of including an interview clip with her in the film without consent. In a radio interview Cheung admitted that she and the crew entered the venue of Asian Track Cycling Championships in Japan without a valid press permit. This raised the concern from the Hong Kong Sport Press Association of unauthorised interview events for non-press purposes. 

Cheung apologized and announced on 5 February the screenings of To My Nineteen Year Old Self will be suspended until all issues are clarified.

See also
List of graduates of University of Hong Kong

References

External links

1950 births
Living people
Hong Kong film directors
Chinese women film directors
Alumni of the University of Hong Kong
Alumni of the University of Bristol
New York University alumni
Hong Kong women artists